Chaalis Chauraasi, is a Bollywood crime comedy film directed by Hriday Shetty and starring Naseeruddin Shah, Atul Kulkarni, Kay Kay Menon and Ravi Kishan. Most of the film was shot in Mumbai. It was released on 13 January 2012.

Cast
 Naseeruddin Shah as Pankaj Purushottam Suri (Sir)
 Kay Kay Menon as Albert Pinto  Pinto
 Atul Kulkarni as Bhaskar Sardesai a.k.a. Bobby
 Ravi Kissen as Shakti Chinappa a.k.a. Shakti
 Rupsha Guha 
 Rajesh Sharma as Mahesh Naik
 Shweta Bhardwaj as Madhu
 Zakir Hussain as Tony Bisleri
 Manoj Pahwa as Tilak Shetty
 Arbaaz Ali Khan
 Yuri Suri as Haryanvi Shethi a.k.a. Tau
 Jeet Upendra
 Neelima Uttarwar as Gauri Shetty, wife of Tilak
 D. Santosh as Chandu
 Shital Kohok as bar male singer
 Rupsha Guha as bride
 Shuvendru Sood as groom
 Yashshree Gupta as receptionist, Ad agency
 Partha Akerkar as Vivek, Creative Head, Ad agency
 Jahangir Karkaria as old Parsi man
 Nargis Dastoor as old Parsi woman
 Navin Talreja as Husband (HC; Happy couple)
 Sonal Joshi as Wife (HC; Happy couple)
 Sagar Juneja as Parsi son
 Virendra Pandey as watchman in Parsis's bungalow
 Chandrakant Dani as Ambulance attendant
 Birendra Gupta as Tilak Shetty's accountant
 Digvijay Rohidas as Inspector Kalsekar
 Jageshwar as Hanif
 Amruta Sant as Hanif's girlfriend
 Sadat Shamshi as Hotel Dwarka receptionist
 Vinay Apte as Sheikh saab
 Reetu Jain as 'Badmast' item girl

Box office
In its first weekend, the film netted around 75.75 lakh. Its lifetime collection was INR 2.58 and it was a disaster at the box office.

Soundtrack

The songs of the movie were composed by Lalit Pandit whereas the title song was sung and composed by Vishal Rajan. The music rights were sold to T-Series and released in December 2011. The rights of the song "Hawa Hawa" were acquired from Pakistani Singer Hasan Jahangir. The movie song was sung in two versions, originally sung by Hasan Jahangir. The background score was composed by Sanjoy Chowdhury.

References

External links

 Official website

2012 films
Films shot in Mumbai
2010s crime comedy films
2010s Hindi-language films
Indian crime comedy films
2012 comedy films